Flight 352 may refer to:

 Braniff Flight 352
 TNT Airways Flight 352, see ASL Airlines Belgium#Accidents and incidents
 Vladivostok Air Flight 352

0352